The 2019-20 UMass Lowell River Hawks Men's ice hockey season was the 53rd season of play for the program, the 37th season competing at the Division I level, and the 36th season in the Hockey East conference. The River Hawks represented the University of Massachusetts Lowell and were coached by Norm Bazin, in his 9th season.

The Hockey East tournament as well as the NCAA Tournament were cancelled due to the COVID-19 pandemic before any games were played.

Roster
As of August 1, 2019.

|}

Standings

Schedule and Results

|-
!colspan=12 style=";" | Regular Season

|- 
!colspan=12 style=";" | 
|- align="center" bgcolor="#e0e0e0"
|colspan=12|Tournament Cancelled

Scoring Statistics

Goaltending statistics

Rankings

Players drafted into the NHL

2020 NHL Entry Draft

† incoming freshman

References

2019–20
UMass Lowell River Hawks 
UMass Lowell River Hawks 
2019 in sports in Massachusetts
2020 in sports in Massachusetts